The women's double sculls competition at the 2022 World Rowing Championships took place at the Račice regatta venue.

Schedule
The schedule was as follows:

All times are Central European Summer Time (UTC+2)

Results

Heats
The two fastest boats in each heat advanced directly to the semifinals. The remaining boats were sent to the repechages.

Heat 1

Heat 2

Heat 3

Repechages
The three fastest boats in repechage advanced to the semifinals. The remaining boats sent to the Final C.

Repechage 1

Repechage 2

Semifinals A/B
The three fastest boats in each semi advanced to the A final. The remaining boats were sent to the B final.

Semifinal 1

Semifinal 2

Finals
The A final determined the rankings for places 1 to 6. Additional rankings were determined in the other finals

Final C

Final B

Final A

References

2022 World Rowing Championships